"Miracle" is a song co-written, co-produced and performed by New Zealand recording artist Kimbra, issued as the second single from her second studio album The Golden Echo. It was her first song to chart on Billboard, peaking at #37 on the Japan Hot 100.

Critical reception
The song has received mainly positive reviews from critics, with many complimenting the song's disco-influenced feel. Olivia Forman of Spin stated that the song has a "flawlessly fluctating [...] beat" and additionally complimented Kimbra's vocals. Josh Brooks of Vulture Magazine proclaimed the song as "a killer modern pop disco track" and added that in comparison to the rest of The Golden Echo, the track is where Kimbra is at her "grooviest". Jake Cleland of Pitchfork praised the song but also felt that it was "a-minute-and-a-half too long".

Music video
The official music video for the song was directed by Thom Kerr. Throughout the video, Kimbra is shown dancing down the sidewalk in various costumes, all designed by Australian designer Jaime Lee Major.

Chart positions

References

External links
 

2014 songs
2014 singles
Kimbra songs
Song recordings produced by Rich Costey
Song recordings produced by Kimbra
Songs written by Daniel Johns
Songs written by Kimbra
Songs written by Thundercat (musician)
Warner Records singles
Disco songs
Funk songs